Centaurea cineraria, the velvet centaurea, is also known as dusty miller and silver dust (though these latter two names may also apply to Jacobaea maritima and Silene coronaria). Centaurea cineraria is in the family Asteraceae and is endemic to Italy. In natural settings, it grows on coastal cliffs, ranging from 0–350 m above sea level. Mature plants may reach  in height. Centaurea cineraria produces purple flowers.

Centaurea cineraria is taxonomically complicated, with several described subspecies and lots of geographic variation. Members of the C. cineraria group have variously been treated as full species, as subspecies, or simply as regional variations.

In Horticulture 
Centaurea cineraria is commonly cultivated for its foliage. Depending on climate, it can be grown as either an annual or as a perennial. In cultivation, this species prefers full sun and well-drained soil.

Centaurea cineraria is sometimes referred to as Centaurea gymnocarpa within the horticultural trade, due to both taxonomic confusion and/or potential hybridization between C. cineraria and C. gymnocarpa in cultivation. However, cultivated material seems to mostly consist of C. cineraria in a narrower sense, with some possible introgression from other members of the C. cineraria group (including C. gymnocarpa). True C. gymnocarpa is a rare plant in the wild and likely does not exist in cultivation outside of conservation settings. Despite past work that sometimes treated C. gymnocarpa as conspecific with C. cineraria, current work supports both taxa at the species level.

Centaurea cineraria occasionally escapes from cultivation, but, at least in North America, this has not resulted in established exotic populations. This species is, however, naturalized in New Zealand.

In the UK Centaurea cineraria subsp. cineraria has gained the Royal Horticultural Society's Award of Garden Merit.<ref name="RHSPF">{{cite web | url = https://www.rhs.org.uk/Plants/75483/Centaurea-cineraria-subsp-cineraria/Details
| title = Centaurea cineraria subsp. cineraria | website = www.rhs.org | publisher = Royal Horticultural Society | accessdate = 12 April 2020}}</ref>

Because of similar leaf shape, leaf hairiness, and leaf color, there has been much confusion in the horticultural world between C. cineraria and the unrelated Jacobaea maritima (with Senecio cineraria being an old name for Jacobaea maritima). Jacobaea maritima has similar foliage to C. cineraria (indeed, "cineraria" means "ash-gray colored"). Cultivars like ‘Silver Dust’, ‘Silver Lace’, and ‘Cirrus’ are sometimes mistakenly referred to as C. cineraria but these cultivars actually pertain to J. maritima. The cultivar 'Colchester White' (named for the leaf color, not the flower color) does actually pertain to C. cineraria'' and is the most common cultivar of this species. This confusion has also resulted in many images on the internet being mistakenly identified, resulting in identification of cultivated material challenging, especially without reproductive parts.

References

 Cela Renzoni G, Viegi L.. 1983. Centaurea cineraria s.l. (Asteraceae) in Italia: revisione citotassonomica.. Atti della Società Toscana di Scienze Naturali. Memorie serie B, 89: pp. 99–144. Società Toscana di Scienze Naturali, Pisa.
 Ellis, Barbara W., "Taylor's Guide to Annuals, How to Select and Grow More Than 400 Annuals, Biennials, and Tender Perennials", 1999 Haughton Mifflin Company, New York, NY
 Armitage, Allan M., "Armitage's Manual of Annuals, Biennials, and Half-Hardy Perennials", illustrated Asha Kays and Chris Johnson, 2001 Timber Press Inc., Singapore

External links
 United States Department of Agriculture
 

cineraria
Plants described in 1753
Taxa named by Carl Linnaeus